Working Stiff: Two Years, 262 Bodies, and the Making of a Medical Examiner is a non-fiction book written by Judy Melinek and T. J. Mitchell, a wife-and-husband writing team. In July 2001 two months before the September 11 attacks, Judy Melinek, MD, and her husband moved from Los Angeles to New York City, where she started training in forensic pathology at the Office of Chief Medical Examiner of the City of New York (headed by Charles Hirsch). The book describes some of the 262 autopsies performed by Dr. Melinek during the two years of her training. As part of a medical team she examined the remains of many of the 9/11 victims. The book was published by Charles Scribner's Sons in 2014.

Reception

References

External links

2014 non-fiction books
Books about death
English-language books
Charles Scribner's Sons books